Valea Perjei may refer to:

Valea Perjei, Cimişlia, Moldova
Valea Perjei, Taraclia, Moldova

See also
Valea (disambiguation)